Konstantin Zakharov (born 31 March 1973, Khutor Sokol'skiy, Ust-Labinsky District) is a Russian political figure and a deputy of the 8th State Dumas.
 
From 1992 to 1995, Zakharov worked as a repairman to maintain ventilation and air conditioning systems at Uralvagonzavod. In 1999, he headed a youth organization of the Uralvagonzavod and became assistant to the general director of the enterprise for work with youth. From 2004 to 2012, Zakharov was the deputy of the Nizhny Tagil City Duma. From 2005 to 2009, he was the Deputy General Director for Marketing and Sales of the Uralvagonzavod. In 2010, he became the CEO of the Verkhnyaya Salda Metallurgical Plant. In 2011, he was appointed the head of the administration of the Leninsky district of Nizhny Tagil. From 2012 to 2017, he was the Deputy head of Nizhny Tagil. Since September 2021, he has served as deputy of the 8th State Duma.

References
 

 

1973 births
Living people
United Russia politicians
21st-century Russian politicians
Eighth convocation members of the State Duma (Russian Federation)
People from Nizhny Tagil